William Porter Finney (April 14, 1871 – March 6, 1954) was an American college football player and coach. He was second head football coach at Iowa Agricultural College—now known as the Iowa State University in Ames, Iowa, serving for one season, in 1893, and compiled a record of 0–3. Finney also coached Kentucky State College—now known as the University of Kentucky—in 1894, tallying a mark of 5–2.

Finney attended Purdue University, where he played on the football team from 1890 to 1893. He was the captain of the 1893 team and also won multiple letters in the sport.

Finney later relocated to California, where he was employed as a railway engineer.

Head coaching record

References

External links
 

1871 births
1954 deaths
19th-century players of American football
American railway civil engineers
American football tackles
Iowa State Cyclones football coaches
Kentucky Wildcats football coaches
Purdue Boilermakers football players
People from Vermillion County, Indiana